I Only Wanted You is the sixth solo studio album by American country music singer Marie Osmond. It was Osmond's second album issued on Capitol/Curb Records and was released in 1986.

Background
The album consists of ten tracks of country pop material. It includes some guitar and bass solos and some saxophone solos as well on some of the songs.
Like its predecessor, the album spawned four singles on the Billboard Country Chart, beginning with a Paul Davis duet entitled, "You're Still New to Me" in 1986. It was followed by the title track released towards the end of 1986, then "Everybody's Crazy 'Bout My Baby," and "Cry Just a Little."

The album was released on CD by Curb Records in 1990, along with her other Capitol albums.

Track listing

Personnel
 Kathie Baillie — background vocals
 Eddie Bayers — drums
 Jessica Boucher — background vocals
 Michael Brooks — background vocals
 Dennis Burnside — piano, string arrangements
 Larry Byrom — acoustic guitar
 Terry Choate — steel guitar
 Paul Davis — lead vocals and background vocals on "You're Still New to Me"
 Thomas Flora — background vocals
 Steve Gibson — electric guitar
 Jim Horn — saxophone
 Dave Innis — synthesizer
 Mike Lawler — synthesizer
 Alan LeBeouf — background vocals
 Kenny Mims — electric guitar
 Marie Osmond — lead vocals
 Michael Rhodes — bass guitar
 Tom Roady — percussion
 Tom Robb — bass guitar
 Lisa Silver — background vocals
 James Stroud — drums
 Diane Tidwell — background vocals
 Dennis Wilson — background vocals
 Paul Worley — acoustic guitar, electric guitar, background vocals

Chart performance

Album

Singles

References

1986 albums
Marie Osmond albums
Curb Records albums
Albums produced by Paul Worley
Capitol Records albums